Hendrix the Husky is a mascot at the University of Washington Tacoma, often seen at events hosted by the institution such as Husky Hangouts, new student orientations, and movie nights. The mascot, a male husky dog, was introduced in 2009.

History
In summer 2008, the Student Activity Board at UW Tacoma wished to adopt a school mascot for the university, and the school's Spirit and Traditions chair began to work on the idea shortly after. They teamed up with Student Affairs and Husky Athletics and nine months later in early 2009, the husky mascot was introduced. The university's students were asked to vote on what to name him, with the stipulation that the name begin with "H". Names such as Hayley, Hilda, and Humphrey were submitted to the ballot, but the ultimate winner of the vote was "Hendrix" (the second most popular name was "Hauser"). It is rumored that the name was inspired by Seattle-born rock musician Jimi Hendrix.

Personality
Hendrix is often seen wearing a UW jersey and shorts. The mascot has an enlightening spirit and plentiful enthusiasm which is conveyed by his energetic handshakes and innocent curiosity. All spirit around campus is led by him, and he usually travels with a handler. It is not known if Hendrix can speak; no one has heard his voice, but it is rumored he can speak at a high frequency. Students say he loves to sing, but during the one showcase when he was about to sing, the sound system started to malfunction. 

Students around campus are keen to learn more about Hendrix's true identity.
He is most likely the brother of Harry the Husky and Holly the Husky. The mascot enjoys receiving fist bumps.

References

Washington Huskies
College mascots in the United States
University of Washington Tacoma